Medicine is a continually updated, evidence-based medical review journal covering internal medicine and its specialties. It was established by Simon Campbell-Smith in 1972 and is published by Medicine Publishing. The editor-in-chief is Allister Vale (City Hospital, Birmingham).

Scope 
The journal aims to cover the fundamentals of internal medicine in a systematic way during a recurring four-year cycle – it can be seen as a general medicine textbook that is published "a chapter at a time". It covers the topics at a level appropriate to the non-specialist, providing clinicians with up-to-date, understandable clinical information. It is aimed specifically at trainees in internal medicine and its specialties who are preparing for postgraduate examinations. The journal is abstracted and indexed by Scopus and Embase.

Editors-in-chief 
The following persons have been editor-in-chief ("chairman of the board") of the journal:
 Sir John McMichael FRS (1972–1978) 
 Sir John Badenoch (1979–1996)
 Alasdair Geddes (1996–2002)
 Allister Vale (2003–present)

References

External links 
 

Internal medicine journals
Elsevier academic journals
English-language journals
Monthly journals
Publications established in 1972